The Immortal Vagabond is a 1953 West German musical drama film directed by Arthur Maria Rabenalt and starring Karlheinz Böhm, Ingrid Stenn, and Heliane Bei. It is a remake of the 1930 film of the same title. It was shot at the Bavaria Studios in Munich and on location in Tyrol in Austria. The film's sets were designed by the art directors Willy Schatz and Felix Smetana.

Cast

References

External links

German musical drama films
West German films
Films directed by Arthur Maria Rabenalt
Films based on operettas
Remakes of German films
1950s musical drama films
1953 drama films
German black-and-white films
Films scored by Edmund Eysler
1950s German films
Films shot in Austria
Films shot at Bavaria Studios